Chak 132 SB is a village in Sillanwali Tehsil of Sargodha District in Punjab, Pakistan. It is an agricultural area

Being a part of Kirana Bar it was colonised by the British after World War I, when all of the village land was handed over to retired armed personnels of the British Army, and the original inhabitants of the village were forcibly evicted and had their lands seized.

Most of land is owning by Pakhtoon, Rajput, Mughals and arain  families.

Education 
The village has multiple schools: 
 Girls Secondary School
 Boys Secondary School 
White crecent school

References

External links
Airport images
Maplandia

Populated places in Sargodha District